Javier 'Javi' Costa Estirado (born 18 April 1997 in Almassora, Castellón, Valencia) is a Spanish footballer who plays for CF Borriol in Tercera División, as a right defender.

See also
Football in Spain
List of football clubs in Spain

References

External links
 
 Futbolme profile 

1986 births
Living people
Spanish footballers
Footballers from the Valencian Community
Association football defenders
Segunda División players
Villarreal CF B players